Homer Raymond Jones (September 3, 1893 – November 26, 1970) was an American politician and government official.  He served as a member of the United States House of Representatives from 1947 to 1949, representing the First Congressional District of Washington as a Republican.

Biography
Jones was born in Martinsburg, Missouri on September 3, 1893, and his family moved to Bremerton, Washington in 1901.  He attended the public schools of Bremerton and studied business administration at Seattle Business College.  During World War I he served in the United States Navy, enlisting in 1917, and remaining in uniform until his 1919 discharge.

After the war, Jones was employed as a sheet metal worker at the Bremerton Navy Yard.  A resident of Charleston, Washington, he served on the city council from 1922 to 1924, and as mayor from 1924 to 1927. (Charleston was consolidated with Bremerton in 1927.)  Jones was Kitsap County Treasurer from 1926 to 1929, and Assistant Washington State Treasurer from 1929 to 1933.  From 1933 to 1937, Jones was treasurer of Bremerton, and he served as Bremerton's mayor from 1939 to 1941.

Jones served as state commander of the American Legion from 1934 to 1935.  He received a commission in the United States Navy Reserve and was ordered to active duty for World War II; he served until the end of the war as a public affairs officer for the 13th Naval District, which was headquartered in Seattle.  He was discharged as a captain in 1946, and his awards and decorations included the Bronze Star Medal.

In 1944, Jones was an unsuccessful candidate for the Republican nomination for State Treasurer.  In 1946, he was elected as a Republican to the 80th Congress (January 3, 1947 – January 3, 1949).  He was an unsuccessful candidate for reelection in 1948 to the 81st first Congress.  From 1949 to 1955, he was superintendent of the Washington State Veterans' Home in Retsil, and he served again as Assistant State Treasurer from 1953 to 1957.

Jones died in Bremerton on November 26, 1970, and was buried at Woodlawn Cemetery in Bremerton.

Homer R. Jones Drive in Bremerton is named for him.

References

Jones, Homer Raymond at Political Graveyard

1893 births
1970 deaths
20th-century American politicians
United States Navy personnel of World War I
United States Navy personnel of World War II
City and town treasurers in the United States
County officials in Washington (state)
Mayors of places in Washington (state)
People from Audrain County, Missouri
People from Bremerton, Washington
Republican Party members of the United States House of Representatives from Washington (state)
United States Navy officers
United States Navy reservists
Washington (state) city council members